Dark Forest may refer to:

 Dark Forest, (selva oscura) in the first line of Dante's Inferno
 Dark Forest (film), a South Korean horror film
 "Dark Forest", episode of the TV show A Haunting
 Dark Forest, room in the television game show Legends of the Hidden Temple 
 Dark Forest, afterlife in the Redwall fantasy novel series
 Dark Forest, forbidden area on the Hogwarts campus in the Harry Potter series
 The Dark Forest, Chinese science-fiction novel by Liu Cixin, sequel to The Three-Body Problem
 The Dark Forest, a novel by Hugh Walpole
 Dark Forest, afterlife in the Warriors series by Erin Hunter
 Dark Forest, themed area at the Alton Towers Resort
 darkforest, a Go playing computer program being developed by Facebook
 Dark forest hypothesis, a solution to the Fermi paradox that states that civilizations remain silent to prevent interstellar warfare